River is the third studio album by English vocalist Terry Reid. It was released in 1973 by Atlantic Records. It was produced by Tom Dowd and written by Terry Reid.

Track listing
All tracks are written by Terry Reid
 "Dean" - 4:45
 "Avenue" - 5:08
 "Things to Try" - 4:25
 "Live Life" - 5:11
 "River" - 5:45
 "Dream" - 5:20
 "Milestones" 5:52

Personnel
Terry Reid - vocals, guitar
David Lindley - electric guitar, steel guitar, slide guitar, violin
Lee Miles - bass guitar
Conrad Isidore - drums
Willie Bobo - all percussion parts on "River"

References

1973 albums
Terry Reid albums
Albums produced by Tom Dowd